James Henry Hundon Jr (born April 9, 1971) is a former American football wide receiver who played four seasons with the Cincinnati Bengals of the National Football League. He first enrolled at City College of San Francisco before transferring to Portland State University. He attended Jefferson High School in Daly City, California. Hundon was also a member of the San Jose SaberCats, San Francisco Demons, Toronto Argonauts and Calgary Stampeders. He was featured on the cover of Sports Illustrated following week one of the XFL season.

References

External links
Just Sports Stats

Living people
1971 births
Players of American football from San Francisco
American football wide receivers
Canadian football wide receivers
African-American players of American football
African-American players of Canadian football
City College of San Francisco Rams football players
Portland State Vikings football players
Cincinnati Bengals players
San Francisco Demons players
San Jose SaberCats players
Calgary Stampeders players
Toronto Argonauts players
Players of Canadian football from San Francisco
21st-century African-American sportspeople
20th-century African-American sportspeople